The Michigan MAC Trophy is given to the Mid-American Conference (MAC) university from Michigan – Central Michigan University (CMU), Eastern Michigan University (EMU) and Western Michigan University (WMU) – which has the best head-to-head record in each season of each sport. There are two separate trophies, one for football and the other for men's basketball.  It is one of a handful of trophies in college sports contested between three teams; others are the Commander-in-Chief's Trophy and the irregularly awarded Florida Cup and Beehive Boot.

In the event of a tie the Michigan MAC Trophy remains with the previous holder until one of the other rivals claims the title. This happened with both trophies in 2008, when each team finished 2–2 in men's basketball and 1–1 in football; Western Michigan retained the men's basketball trophy and Eastern Michigan retained the football trophy. It also happened in 2012 with the football trophy, when EMU retained it.

Western Michigan has won the most total trophies with 14, 7 in basketball and 7 in football.

Eastern Michigan currently holds both the football trophy and the men's basketball trophy.

History
The Michigan MAC Trophy was created in 2005 by the Michigan Sports Hall of Fame.  There are two trophies, one given to the winner of the football series and the other to the winner of the men's basketball series.  CMU, EMU and WMU have been competing together in the MAC since 1974 (although WMU joined the MAC in 1948).

Central Michigan won the football trophy in 2009 after Eastern Michigan won the previous two.  The football trophy was won by all three schools in the trophy's first three years of existence.  WMU won the first four basketball trophies before CMU won in 2010.

Western Michigan University claimed the inaugural Michigan MAC Trophy for each sport. Western Michigan also has the most trophies with 14, 7 in football and 7 in basketball.

Results

* Tie; retained trophy

Football

Men's basketball

Total trophies

Total records

Football

Men's basketball

See also
 CMU-WMU football rivalry
 CMU-EMU football rivalry

References

College football rivalry trophies in the United States
College basketball rivalry trophies in the United States
Central Michigan Chippewas football
Eastern Michigan Eagles football
Western Michigan Broncos football
Central Michigan Chippewas men's basketball
Eastern Michigan Eagles men's basketball
Western Michigan Broncos men's basketball
Awards established in 2005